Kojur (also Romanized as Kujur; also known as Baladeh-ye Kujūr, Kujūr, Dehe Kujūr) is a city in Tavabe-e Kojur Rural District, Kojur District, Nowshahr County, Mazandaran Province, Iran. At the 2006 census, its population was 2,215, in 570 families. The city was founded by the Paduspanid ruler Eskandar II.

See also
 Kojur River

References 

Populated places in Nowshahr County
Cities in Mazandaran Province